Worst Case Scenario is the debut studio album by Belgian rock band Deus released in 1994. The cover art was designed by guitarist Rudy Trouvé. It contains the single "Suds & Soda", which became an underground hit and a fans favorite.

The album was first released in Belgium on the indie label Bang! with a different track listing: "Right as Rain" and "Great American Nude" (both tracks present on the Zea EP released in Belgium in 1993) are replaced by the song "Let Go". It was then released in the UK and Europe through Island Records with the track listing as written below.

The song "W.C.S. (First Draft)" contains a covered bit from Frank Zappa's "Little Umbrellas", from his 1969 album, Hot Rats.

Worst Case Scenario received good reviews internationally despite the hard time that the British media had to categorize its music into a genre. They finally called it Art rock (a definition which still bothers singer Tom Barman).

Worst Case Scenario reached Gold in Belgium, selling 30,000 copies. By April 2008, WCS had sold 270,000 copies worldwide.

Track listing (International Version)

Track listing (Belgian Version)

B-Sides and Rarities (2009 Deluxe Edition Bonus Disc)

Staff 
 Tom Barman - vocals, guitar, piano
 Rudy Trouvé - guitar, vocals, piano, steel plate
 Stef Kamil Carlens - bass, vocals, guitar
 Klaas Janzoons - violin, vocals
 Julle de Borgher - drums, metallophone, gasheating, timpani, maracas, guitar, vocals

Singles 
 Suds & Soda (June 1994)
 Via (October 1994)
 Hotellounge (Be the death of me) (January 1995) - #55 UK

Charts references:

References 

Deus (band) albums
1994 albums
Island Records albums